The 2015 Maidstone Borough Council election took place on 7 May 2015 to elect members of the Maidstone Borough Council in England. It was held on the same day as other local elections.

References

2015 English local elections
May 2015 events in the United Kingdom
2015
2010s in Kent